The 1991–92 season was Cardiff City F.C.'s 65th season in the Football League. They competed in the 24-team Division Four, then the fourth tier of English football, finishing ninth.

Players

First team squad.

Standings

Results by round

Fixtures and results

Fourth Division

Source

League Cup

FA Cup

Welsh Cup

Autoglass Trophy

See also
List of Cardiff City F.C. seasons

References

Bibliography

Welsh Football Data Archive

Cardiff City F.C. seasons
Cardiff City
Cardiff City